Kewaunee is a city in Kewaunee County, Wisconsin, United States. The population was 2,837 at the 2020 census. Located on the northwestern shore of Lake Michigan, the city is the county seat of Kewaunee County. Its Menominee name is Kewāneh, an archaic name for a species of duck.

Kewaunee is part of the Green Bay Metropolitan Statistical Area.

History
Kewaunee was the site of a Potawatomi village at the time of European contact in the seventeenth century. French Jesuit missionary Jacques Marquette celebrated All Saints Day at the Potawatomi village in 1674. Later, French explorer René-Robert Cavelier, Sieur de La Salle visited the village in 1679, and Canadian Jesuit Jean-François Buisson de Saint-Cosme stopped in September 1698. The Potawatomis moved south and east along Lake Michigan in the eighteenth century, and the area was reclaimed by Menominee people. Trader Jacques Vieau established a short lived trading post for the North West Company in the area of Kewaunee in 1795. The United States acquired the land from the Menominee nation in the 1831 Treaty of Washington.
 
The current settlement at Kewaunee began in 1836, when false rumors of gold deposits in the Kewaunee River triggered a minor gold rush of Yankee settlers. Land speculator Joshua Hathaway surveyed and platted the settlement. When no gold was found, the settlers who remained established a sawmill and developed the local harbor for the lumber industry. Kewaunee became the county seat of Kewaunee County at the time of the county's formation in 1852. In the late nineteenth century, the community attracted many Czech and German immigrants.

Geography
Kewaunee is located at  (44.458758, -87.509496).

Highways
  WIS 42 Northbound travels to Algoma, Wisconsin. South it continues into Two Rivers and Manitowoc, Wisconsin.
  WIS 29 connects with Green Bay, Wisconsin westbound.

Demographics

2020 census
As of the census of 2020, the population was 2,837. The racial makeup of the city was 91.5% White, 0.5% Black or African American, 0.5% Asian, 0.5% Native American, 1.9% from other races, and 5.1% from two or more races. Ethnically, the population was 4.2% Hispanic or Latino of any race.

2010 census
As of the census of 2010, there were 2,952 people, 1,278 households, and 733 families living in the city. The racial makeup of the city was 96.6% White, 0.3% African American, 0.3% Native American, 0.4% Asian, 1.1% from other races, and 1.1% from two or more races. Hispanic or Latino of any race were 1.8% of the population

There were 1,278 households, of which 25.3% had children under the age of 18 living with them, 45.9% were married couples living together, 7.7% had a female householder with no husband present, 3.8% had a male householder with no wife present, and 42.6% were non-families. 36.5% of all households were made up of individuals, and 16.6% had someone living alone who was 65 years of age or older. The average household size was 2.24 and the average family size was 2.81.

The median age in the city was 45.8 years. 19.8% of residents were under the age of 18; 6.7% were between the ages of 18 and 24; 22.4% were from 25 to 44; 28.5% were from 45 to 64; and 22.6% were 65 years of age or older. The gender makeup of the city was 50.4% male and 49.6% female.

2000 census
As of the census of 2000, there were 2,806 people, 1,149 households, and 736 families living in the city. The population density was 807.7 people per square mile (312.2/km2). There were 1,237 housing units at an average density of 356.1 per square mile (137.6/km2). The racial makeup of the city was 98.25% White, 0.36% African American, 0.39% Native American, 0.21% Asian, 0.14% from other races, and 0.64% from two or more races. Hispanic or Latino of any race were 0.57% of the population.

There were 1,149 households, out of which 29.5% had children under the age of 18 living with them, 53.1% were married couples living together, 7.7% had a female householder with no husband present, and 35.9% were non-families. 32.6% of all households were made up of individuals, and 17.6% had someone living alone who was 65 years of age or older. The average household size was 2.34 and the average family size was 2.97.

In the city, the population was spread out, with 23.3% under the age of 18, 7.7% from 18 to 24, 25.5% from 25 to 44, 21.7% from 45 to 64, and 21.8% who were 65 years of age or older. The median age was 41 years. For every 100 females, there were 95.8 males. For every 100 females age 18 and over, there were 91.4 males.

The median income for a household in the city was $36,420, and the median income for a family was $45,643. Males had a median income of $32,292 versus $20,544 for females. The per capita income for the city was $17,384. About 11.2% of families and 10.5% of the population were below the poverty line, including 8.0% of those under age 18 and 18.0% of those age 65 or over.

Economy
 The Kewaunee Nuclear Generating Station is in Carlton in Kewaunee County. The Kewaunee Power Station was decommissioned on May 7, 2013.

Healthcare 
Kewaunee is home to two primary care clinics and one urgent care center. The area is in both a mental health and primary care Health Professional Shortage Area (HPSA) qualifying the area as a medical desert. There are 7 primary care providers per 100,000 population in Kewaunee compared to the statewide average of 75.6. By 2035, the area is expected to have a 93.7% deficit in physicians, the largest deficit in Wisconsin. There are no behavior health professionals in Kewaunee.

Attractions

 Kewaunee Pierhead Lighthouse
 Kewaunee Marshland Walk
 Tallest Grandfather Clock
 Tug Ludington
 Ahnapee State Trail

Notable people

 Jerry Augustine, MLB player, head coach of the University of Wisconsin-Milwaukee Panthers baseball team
 Henry Baetz, Treasurer of Wisconsin
 Colin Cochart, NFL player
 Joseph E. Darbellay, Wisconsin State Representative
 Art Fiala, the last surviving World War I veteran from Wisconsin
 George Grimmer, Wisconsin State Senator
 Terry Jorgensen, MLB player
 John C. Karel, Wisconsin State Representative
 L. Albert Karel, Wisconsin State Representative
 Thomas F. Konop, U.S. Representative
 Stan Kuick, NFL player
 Ransom Asa Moore, professor
 Robert E. Minahan, Mayor of Green Bay, Wisconsin
 Jack Novak, NFL player
 Alvin E. O'Konski, U.S. Representative
 John Milton Read, Wisconsin legislator and newspaper editor
 Dena A. Smith, Wisconsin State Treasurer
 Joseph Stika, U.S. Coast Guard Vice Admiral

Gallery

References

External links

 City of Kewaunee
 Sanborn fire insurance maps: 1885 1892 1898 1905 1911

Cities in Wisconsin
Cities in Kewaunee County, Wisconsin
County seats in Wisconsin
Wisconsin populated places on Lake Michigan
Green Bay metropolitan area